Blackpink is a South Korean girl group formed by YG Entertainment, consisting of members Jisoo, Jennie, Rosé, and Lisa. Their debut single album Square One and its follow-up Square Two, released in August and November 2016 respectively, won the group several new artist awards between late 2016 to early 2017, including at the 31st Golden Disc Awards and the 26th Seoul Music Awards. At the 6th Gaon Chart Music Awards, Square One single "Whistle" won Song of the Year – August, while the Square Two single "Playing with Fire" won Song of the Year – November. "Whistle" also won Best Music Video at the 2016 Mnet Asian Music Awards and received a nomination for a Digital Bonsang at the 31st Golden Disc Awards.

Blackpink's next two singles "As If It's Your Last" and "Ddu-Du Ddu-Du" both won the Digital Bonsang award at the 32nd and 33rd Golden Disc Awards respectively. "Ddu-Du Ddu-Du", the lead single from their first extended play Square Up (2018), also won the Best Dance – Female award at the 2018 Melon Music Awards and Song of the Year – June at the 8th Gaon Chart Music Awards. "Kill This Love", the lead single from their second extended play Kill This Love (2019), won "The Music Video of 2019" award at the 45th People's Choice Awards, where Blackpink also won "The Group of 2019" award.

Blackpink's first studio album, The Album (2020), received nominations for Album of the Year at the 2020 Melon Music Awards, the 2020 Mnet Asian Music Awards, and the 35th Golden Disc Awards and won the Best Album Bonsang at the latter. Lead single "How You Like That" received Song of the Year nominations at all three ceremonies and won Best Dance (Female Group) awards at the first two and the Digital Bonsang award at the third. The song also garnered Blackpink their first ever Guinness World Records, five in total, including for the most-viewed video on YouTube in 24 hours, and won the MTV Music Video Award for Song of Summer, making them the first K-pop girl group to win an MTV VMA. "How You Like That" and "Lovesick Girls" from The Album won Song of the Year – June and Song of the Year – October respectively at the 10th Gaon Chart Music Awards. Blackpink also won Best Female Group at the 2020 Mnet Asian Music Awards and was selected by Variety as its 2020 Hitmakers Group of the Year. In 2021, Blackpink earned their sixth Guinness World Record for having the most subscribers for a music artist on YouTube, and received a nomination at the Billboard Music Awards for Top Social Artist.

In 2022, Blackpink earned the MTV Video Music Award and the MTV Europe Music Award for Best Metaverse Performance with their in-game concert Blackpink: The Virtual on PUBG Mobile; the group also won a Guinness World Record for being the inaugural winner of the category at the MTV Video Music Awards. The group's second studio album Born Pink (2022) topped the US and UK album charts upon release, earning Blackpink two further Guinness World Records as the first K-pop girl group to do so. Born Pink was nominated for Album of the Year at the 2022 Genie Music Awards, the 2022 Melon Music Awards, the 2022 MAMA Awards, and the 37th Golden Disc Awards and won the Best Album Bonsang at the latter. Lead single "Pink Venom" was nominated for Song of the Year at the 2022 MAMA Awards and won Best Music Video, while Blackpink won Best Female Group at the ceremony as well. "Pink Venom" and "Shut Down" from Born Pink won Song of the Year – August and Song of the Year – September respectively at the 12th Circle Chart Music Awards, at which Blackpink was also awarded the Female Group of the Year. In 2023, Blackpink became the first Korean girl group to be recognized by the Brit Awards with their nomination for Best International Group, and received their tenth Guinness World Record for being the most-streamed girl group on Spotify.

Awards and nominations

Other accolades

Listicles

World records 

According to Guinness World Records, Blackpink's "Kill This Love" (2019) had only a fleeting grasp of the three YouTube video record titles for just one week before being quickly surpassed by BTS' "Boy With Luv". As such, while the awarding body acknowledged the brief retaining period, the video was never certified as an official world record holder.

See also

Notes

References

Blackpink
Awards